The 2012 WPA World Eight-ball Championship was a professional eight-ball championship, organized by the World Pool-Billiard Association (WPA), and held 11–18 February 2012 at the Fujairah Exhibition Centre of the Al Diar Siji Hotel in Fujairah, United Arab Emirates. A total of 96 players from all of the WPA's six regions participated.

Dennis Orcollo winner of the 2012 event lost in the round of 32 to Karol Skowerski. The event was won by Chang Jung-lin, who defeated Fu Che-wei in the final 11–6.

Prize money

Finals

References

External links
 Event at AZBilliards

WPA World Eight-ball Championship
WPA World Eight-ball Championship
WPA World Eight-ball Championship
International sports competitions hosted by the United Arab Emirates